Stenachroia elongella, the sorghum earhead worm or cob borer, is a moth of the family Pyralidae. The species was first described by George Hampson in 1898. It is found in India and Sri Lanka.

During 1977 and 1978, the species was recorded as a major pest of maize cobs, damaging mature grains, in the Khasi Hills in Meghalaya, India.

References

Moths of Asia
Moths described in 1898
Galleriinae
Insect pests of millets